Sigelinde (minor planet designation: 552 Sigelinde) is a minor planet orbiting the Sun.

It was named after a character in Richard Wagner's opera Die Walküre (The Valkyrie).

References

External links 
 
 

000552
Discoveries by Max Wolf
Named minor planets
Richard Wagner
19041214